Emanuel Chobot (1 January 1881 in Orłowa – 7 June 1944 in Moravská Ostrava) was a Polish trade union activist and politician from the region of Zaolzie, Czechoslovakia. He was the chairman of the Polish Socialist Workers Party, the social democratic party active amongst the Polish minority in interbellum Czechoslovakia. He was also the Director-General of the Consumers Association 'Gec' in Moravská Ostrava.

Personal life
Chobot was the son of Józef Chobot (a coal miner by profession) and Barbara Uher. He graduated from elementary school in Orłowa and worked as a coal miner in Łazy and (1895-1898) and Orłowa (1898-1907). He was married to Franziska Onderek.

Chobot lived at Nádražní 96, Moravská Ostrava, and had telephone number '23-62'.

Trade unionism and cooperative movement
Chobot joined the miners movement. He was a member of the miners union 'Prokop' and the Miners' Union of Moravia, Silesia and Galicia (later transformed into the Miners' Union of Austria). Chobot led the Třinec branch of the Union of Metalworkers. Chobot was also active in the cooperative movement. He served as deputy chairman of the District Health Fund in Cieszyn 1910-1912. From 1912 he led the Ostrava branch of the Austrian consumers' cooperative movement. During the First World War, he led the Polish Workers Association 'Siła'.

Parliamentarian
Chobot was elected Member of Parliament in the 1929 Czechoslovak parliamentary election, representing the electoral coalition of the Polish minority parties and the Jewish Party. Chobot was one of two Polish parliamentarians elected on behalf of this coalition, the other being Jan Buzek of the Polish People's Party.

References

1881 births
1944 deaths
People from Orlová
People from Austrian Silesia
Polish people from Zaolzie
Polish Socialist Workers Party politicians
Members of the Chamber of Deputies of Czechoslovakia (1929–1935)
Members of the Executive of the Labour and Socialist International
Polish cooperative organizers
Polish coal miners